Brandon Woodard is an American politician currently serving in the Kansas House of Representatives, representing the 30th House District as a member of the Democratic Party.

Openly gay, he was elected alongside Susan Ruiz as one of the state's first-ever LGBT state legislators. During the campaign, he weathered a controversy when it was revealed that he had previously spent five days in jail for a second offense of driving under the influence.

He has been named the Ranking Minority Member of the House Higher Education Budget Committee starting in January 2020, succeeding Democrat Brandon Whipple, who left the Kansas House of Representatives after being elected Mayor of Wichita, Kansas.

2019-2020 House Committee Assignments
Ranking Minority Member of Higher Education Budget (2020)
Federal and State Affairs
Insurance
Member of Higher Education Budget (2019)

References

External links

Living people
Democratic Party members of the Kansas House of Representatives
LGBT state legislators in Kansas
Gay politicians
21st-century American politicians
People from Lenexa, Kansas
1990 births
21st-century LGBT people